L'eccezione may refer to:

 "L'eccezione" (Carmen Consoli song), 2002
 "L'eccezione" (Madame song), 2022